Gary Sean Mackay-Steven (born 31 August 1990) is a Scottish professional footballer who plays as a winger for Scottish Premiership club Heart of Midlothian.

Having not made the first team at English clubs Liverpool and Fulham, he began his professional career with Airdrie United in January 2011, spending half a season there before moving to top-flight team Dundee United. He remained with Dundee United until February 2015, when he was signed by Celtic for £250,000. He joined Aberdeen in 2017, and joined New York City FC when his contract expired in July 2019.

Mackay-Steven has made two full international appearances for Scotland.

Club career

Early career
Born in Thurso, Caithness, Mackay-Steven began his youth career with Ross County before moving to English Premier League side Liverpool in 2007. After spending two years in the reserve and youth sides, Mackay-Steven was released after an injury-plagued season. He trained with Fulham before eventually returning to Scotland.

Airdrie United
On 11 January 2011, Mackay-Steven joined Scottish Second Division side Airdrie United. He made his debut a week later in the fourth round of the Scottish Cup, starting against Greenock Morton at Cappielow Park and scoring the opening goal of a 2–2 draw from 25 yards out. A week later, in the replay at the Excelsior Stadium, Mackay-Steven scored again, albeit in a 5–2 defeat. He played 19 league matches in the remainder of the season, but did not score.

Dundee United
On 13 July 2011, Mackay-Steven signed a two-year deal with Scottish Premier League club Dundee United. He made his début eight days later as an 80th-minute substitute for Johnny Russell in a UEFA Europa League match against Śląsk Wrocław, which his club won 3–2 but were nonetheless eliminated on the away goals rule. On 24 July, he made his league debut for the club on the opening day of the season, coming on for Barry Douglas for the last 30 minutes of a 1–1 draw against Kilmarnock at Tannadice Park. On 29 August, Mackay-Steven scored his first goal for the club (and his first career league goal), netting in the 3–3 draw at St Johnstone. By the end of the 2011–12 season, Mackay-Steven had established a regular starting place in the first team and become a huge fans' favourite thanks to his large role in helping turn around United's poor start to the season. Mackay-Steven signed an extended contract with the club in January 2012.

Blackburn Rovers scouts were reported to have been watching Mackay-Steven on 24 August 2013, in Dundee United's 4–0 victory over St Johnstone, a game in which he scored. On 12 April 2014, he scored Dundee United's second goal in a 3–1 win against Rangers in the Scottish Cup semi–final at Ibrox. In the final on 17 May, he started in a 2–0 defeat to St Johnstone at Celtic Park, being substituted for Ryan Gauld after 64 minutes.

He scored twice as Dundee United won the Dundee derby 6–2 against Dundee on 1 January 2015.

Celtic

On 16 January 2015, Mackay-Steven signed a pre-contract agreement to join Celtic at the end of the season on the expiry of his Dundee United contract. In the January transfer window, he had been pursued by Nigel Clough, manager of English League One club Sheffield United, who made three bids up to £100,000 while Dundee United wanted a minimum of £250,000. On the transfer deadline day, 2 February, Celtic made an offer of £250,000 and the move was completed immediately, with his Dundee United teammate Stuart Armstrong joining in a separate deal at the same time. Five days later, the pair watched from the stands as Celtic won 2–0 at Dundee in the fifth round of the Scottish Cup.

Mackay-Steven made his debut on 11 February away to Partick Thistle, scoring after 37 seconds in a 3–0 victory. His first goal at Celtic Park came on 1 March as the third in a 4–0 win over Aberdeen, with a shot from 20 yards. On 15 March Celtic won the Scottish League Cup Final against Dundee United, but Mackay-Steven was cup-tied, having already represented Dundee United in the tournament that season.

Aberdeen
On 12 July 2017, Mackay-Steven signed a two-year contract with Aberdeen for an undisclosed fee. He made his debut the following day in a UEFA Europa League second qualifying round first leg at home to NK Široki Brijeg, starting in a 1–1 draw. In the second leg in Bosnia a week after, he scored to wrap up a 2–0 win and advancement.

Mackay-Steven scored his first league goal for Aberdeen on 14 October, the only one of a victory at Hibernian. On 16 December, against the same opponents, he scored his first senior hat-trick in a 4–1 win. Mackay-Steven won the Scottish Cup Goal of the Fourth round award for his strike in the 4–1 win against St Mirren.

In the 2018 Scottish League Cup Final against former club Celtic on 2 December 2018, Mackay-Steven was stretchered from the field after being knocked unconscious by a clash of heads with Dedryck Boyata shortly before the end of the first half (Aberdeen lost 1–0). He was released from hospital after a few days and returned to playing towards the end of January 2019.

New York City FC
On 24 June 2019, Mackay-Steven joined Major League Soccer side New York City on a free transfer, effective from the start of the league's transfer window on 9 July. He made his debut on 14 July during the Hudson River Derby away to the New York Red Bulls  as an 84th-minute substitute for Valentín Castellanos in a 2–1 loss. He scored his first goal on his 29th birthday on 31 August in a 3–1 win at Vancouver Whitecaps FC, after replacing the injured Héber.

Following their 2020 season, Mackay-Steven departed the club after New York City opted to decline their contract option for Mackay-Steven.

Heart of Midlothian

On 8 January 2021, Mackay-Steven returned to Scotland to sign with Heart of Midlothian on a deal which will run until the summer of 2023.

International career
Mackay-Steven made his first international appearance for Scotland on 15 November 2013, replacing Craig Conway for the last six minutes of a goalless friendly draw against the United States at Hampden Park.

He was recalled to the Scotland squad in October 2018, for a friendly against Portugal. He came on as a substitute in the 67th minute, and assisted Steven Naismith in scoring Scotland's only goal of the game.

Personal life
On 27 August 2017, Mackay-Steven was rescued from the River Kelvin in Glasgow after falling in. He was taken to Queen Elizabeth University Hospital where he was treated for hypothermia.

Career statistics

Honours
Celtic
Scottish Premiership: 2014–15, 2015–16, 2016–17
Scottish League Cup: 2016–17

References

External links

1990 births
Living people
Sportspeople from Thurso
Scottish footballers
Association football wingers
Scottish Premier League players
Scottish Football League players
Scottish Professional Football League players
Ross County F.C. players
Liverpool F.C. players
Fulham F.C. players
Airdrieonians F.C. players
Dundee United F.C. players
Celtic F.C. players
Aberdeen F.C. players
New York City FC players
Scotland under-21 international footballers
Scotland international footballers
Scottish expatriate footballers
Expatriate soccer players in the United States
Scottish expatriate sportspeople in the United States
Major League Soccer players
Heart of Midlothian F.C. players